Miguel R. Cornejo (1888–1984) was a Filipino soldier, politician, and lawyer. He served as Municipal President of Pasay and representative from Mountain Province. During the American Administration in the Philippines, and after independence, as an attorney and legislator he championed many causes. In 1939, he compiled and published the Cornejo's Commonwealth Directory of the Philippines, often used as an historical source for the period. Earlier in his career, he served in the Philippine National Guard (PNG) in World War I after legislative enactment of the Militia Act on March 17, 1917. After the war upon its disbandment, because the US Territorial government did not authorize a Philippine Army at the time, Miguel R. Cornejo, together with Manuel David, founded the military organization of the National Volunteers of the Philippines, leading as Brigadier General. Descended from a prominent Spanish Filipino Mestizo Family, he spoke and authored many works in fluent Spanish, English and Tagalog. He married Crisanta Soldevilla of Gasan, Marinduque.

Political career 
Cornejo was a two-term Municipal President (Mayor) of Pasay, then a municipality in the province of Rizal. He was first elected Municipal President in 1919. In 1922, at the end of his term as Municipal President, he was elected Representative of Mountain Province's Lone District for the 6th Philippine Legislature. However, he did not finish his term as he was removed from office by the Governor-General on October 6, 1925 after being convicted and sentenced to imprisonment for assaulting an American. In 1928, he became Municipal President of Pasay once again, serving until 1931.

During the 1930s, Cornejo was the leader of a minor fascist party, which in 1935 became one of the founding parties of the National Socialist Party, which ran former general and first Philippine President Emilio Aguinaldo as its candidate in the 1935 Philippine presidential election.

Personal life 
On June 29, 1974, he married Paulita San Agustin Vicente in Pasay. Paulita also came from a distinct Spanish lineage. Their sponsors were Judge Pio Marcos and Mrs. Leonilla Garcia. He spent the rest of his remaining years with her in Sampaloc, Manila.

His direct descendants are spread all over the world, from Australia to Miami, Florida, USA, Montgomery County Maryland, USA, as well as Ontario, Canada, and include singer Wency Cornejo; composer Dr Rodolfo Cornejo; Women Rights Champion and model Deniece Cornejo; late Naval Colonel and Paranaque politician Councilor Jess C Bustamante; former television personality Joaqui Mendoza; Papal Knight Sir Drexel Gregory; and GMA executive Rodrigo Cornejo.
Another grandson, Gerardo "Gerry" Cornejo, was an award-winning professional photographer and is currently a TV and radio producer and program host in the Philippines.

References 

Book - History of the Armed Forces of the Filipino People by Cesar P. Pobre. New Day Publishers, 2000. Pages 163, 171.*

External links 
Cornell University. Asia Collections - Colonial Era Resources.
Book - The Philippine Army 1935-1942, by Ricardo Trota Jose. Ateneo de Manila University Press, 1992.   Page 21.

1888 births
1984 deaths
20th-century Filipino lawyers
Filipino people of Spanish descent
Members of the House of Representatives of the Philippines from Mountain Province
Mestizo people
Mayors of Pasay
Members of the Philippine Legislature